Bradley David Ausmus (born April 14, 1969) is an American former professional baseball manager and catcher in Major League Baseball (MLB). In his 18-year MLB playing career, Ausmus played for the San Diego Padres, Detroit Tigers, Houston Astros, and Los Angeles Dodgers. He was also the manager of the Tigers and Los Angeles Angels, and of the Israel national baseball team.

A 1987 draft pick of the New York Yankees, he chose to alternate between attending Dartmouth College and playing minor league baseball. Ausmus then had an 18-year major league playing career with the San Diego Padres, Detroit Tigers, Houston Astros, and Los Angeles Dodgers. During his playing days he was an All Star in 1999, a three-time Gold Glove Award winner (2001, '02, and '06), and won the 2007 Darryl Kile Award "for integrity and courage".

A five-time league-leader at catcher in fielding percentage, Ausmus also led the league twice each in range factor and in percentage caught stealing, and once each in putouts and assists.

Ausmus finished his playing career in 2010 ranked third in major league history with 12,839 putouts as a catcher (trailing only Iván Rodríguez and Jason Kendall), seventh in games caught with 1,938, and 10th in both range factor/game (7.12) and fielding percentage (.994). He also ranked first all-time among all Jewish major leaguers in career games played (1,971), fifth in hits (1,579), and eighth in runs batted in (607; directly behind Mike Lieberthal). He was inducted into the National Jewish Sports Hall of Fame in 2004. He worked in the Padres' front office as a special assistant from 2010 to 2013. In November 2013, Ausmus became the 38th manager in the history of the Detroit Tigers, succeeding Jim Leyland, a position that he held for four years. In October 2018, he was named the 17th manager in the history of the Los Angeles Angels, but was dismissed after one season in September 2019. In January 2022, he was named the bench coach of the Oakland Athletics. Ausmus will be a coach for Team Israel, under manager Ian Kinsler, when it competes in the 2023 World Baseball Classic in Miami, Florida, starting March 11–15.

Early and personal life
Ausmus is Jewish, and was born in New Haven, Connecticut. His mother, Linda Susan (née Dronsick), was Jewish, and his father, Harry Jack Ausmus, is Protestant. His father is a retired professor of European history at Southern Connecticut State University, and the author of A Schopenhauerian Critique of Nietzsche's Thought, which Ausmus calls his "favorite book."

Ausmus' mother was raised in a Jewish household, and he said in an interview that those values were instilled in him. He takes pride in his heritage. Ausmus stated in an interview with the Jewish Journal: "I wasn't raised with the Jewish religion, so in that sense I don't really have much feeling toward it. But, however, in the last 10 or so years, I have had quite a few young Jewish boys who will tell me that I am their favorite player or they love watching me play or they feel like baseball is a good fit... I'm all for it."

In 2001, he did not play on Yom Kippur, the Jewish Day of Atonement, quipping that he "was trying to atone for my poor first half." Ausmus was inducted into the National Jewish Sports Hall of Fame in 2004.

Ausmus and his wife, Liz, were married in 1995. They live in New Haven, Connecticut, and have two daughters, Sophie and Abigail.

High school
Ausmus was a star in baseball at Cheshire High School; as a freshman he was a teammate of National Hockey League defenseman Brian Leetch, who was then a pitcher on the school's Connecticut state championship team in 1984. As a sophomore Ausmus played shortstop and batted .327. As a junior (when his coach moved him to catcher) he hit .436, and as a senior he hit .411 and was named the Cheshire Area High School Player of the Year. He was named to the All-State team both his junior and senior years.

Ausmus was also a standout athlete in high school as a basketball guard.

Academically, Ausmus scored a 1220 on his SAT exam.

Draft and college
Ausmus initially declined to sign with the New York Yankees after the 1987 draft in which the team picked him in the 48th round, instead choosing to pursue another childhood dream, that of attending Dartmouth College.

Though he had initially declined to sign with the team, he relented and signed when the Yankees allowed him to attend classes at the Ivy League school, while playing in the minor leagues during his off terms. (Dartmouth has a quartered academic calendar, which allowed Ausmus some flexibility.) Given NCAA rules barring paid professional athletes from playing college sports, Ausmus could not play for the Dartmouth Big Green, and instead served the team as a volunteer coach and bullpen catcher.

He graduated in 1991 with an A.B. in Government, and was a member of Chi Gamma Epsilon fraternity and the Sphinx Senior Society. While at Dartmouth, the lowest grade Ausmus received was a B. College graduates are uncommon in major league baseball, with only 26 players and managers with four-year degrees in 2009. In 2005, Ausmus became the first Ivy League catcher to play in the World Series since Dartmouth's Chief Meyers in 1916. Ausmus was also one of six Ivy Leaguers on major league rosters at the beginning of the 2009 season. In 2010, The Sporting News named him the ninth-smartest athlete in sports.

Though Ausmus was not drafted until the 48th round of the 1987 draft, he played in MLB longer than any of the 1,150 players drafted ahead of him did.

Minor league playing career (1988–93, 2010)
Ausmus spent five years in the Yankees' minor league system with the Gulf Coast Yankees (1988), Oneonta Yankees (1988–89), Prince William Cannons (1990–91), Albany-Colonie Yankees (1991–92), and Columbus Clippers (1992). He was subsequently selected by the Colorado Rockies with the 54th pick of the 1992 expansion draft. He spent less than a year in the Colorado organization (with the Colorado Springs Sky Sox) before he was traded to the San Diego Padres with Andy Ashby and Doug Bochtler for Bruce Hurst and Greg Harris in July 1993.

Major league playing career (1993–2010)

San Diego Padres (1993–96)
He made his major league debut two days later, when he started for the Padres against the Chicago Cubs, and had a single in three at bats. In 1995 Ausmus batted .293, a career best, and stole 16 bases (the most by any catcher since Craig Biggio stole 19 in 1991).

Within three years, Ausmus was on the move again. In June 1996, after 149 at bats in which he batted just .181, the Padres traded him, Andújar Cedeño, and minor leaguer Russ Spear to the Detroit Tigers for John Flaherty and Chris Gomez.

As of 2010, Ausmus was second among the Padres' all-time catchers in stolen bases, fourth in hits, and fifth in games played.

Detroit Tigers (1996)
Despite bouncing back somewhat in Detroit, hitting .248, Ausmus was again traded in December 1996, along with José Lima, Trever Miller, C. J. Nitkowski, and Daryle Ward, to the Houston Astros for Doug Brocail, Brian Hunter, Todd Jones, Orlando Miller, and cash. This marked the first of three times Ausmus would be exchanged between the two teams.

Houston Astros (1997–98)
In January 1999 he was traded by the Astros with C. J. Nitkowski to the Tigers for Paul Bako, Dean Crow, Brian Powell, and minor leaguers Carlos Villalobos and Mark Persails.

Detroit Tigers (1999–2000)
Generally considered light-hitting but sure-handed, Ausmus had his best offensive season in 1999 at the age of 30, when he batted .275 and set career highs in on-base percentage (.365) and slugging percentage (.415), and made the All-Star team. He was hit by pitches 14 times, sixth in the league and a career high. Ausmus batted leadoff for the Tigers seven times, the first catcher since Bruce Kimm in 1976 to do so.

In December 2000, he was traded by the Tigers with Doug Brocail and Nelson Cruz to the Astros for Roger Cedeño, Chris Holt, and Mitch Meluskey.

Houston Astros (2001–08)
In November 2003, he signed as a free agent with the Astros, and Ausmus did the same in December 2005. In 2004, he batted .308 against left-handers, and .364 in situations that were "late and close" (in the seventh inning or later, with the score tied or the tying run on base, at the plate, or on deck).

In 2005, he had more walks (51) than strikeouts (48). He batted .304 with two out and runners in scoring position.

In 2006, Ausmus hit .230 and set a career high with nine sacrifice hits. In Game 4 of the 2005 National League Division Series against the Atlanta Braves, Ausmus homered with two outs in the bottom of the ninth inning to tie the game at 6–6 and send it to extra innings; the Astros went on to win in the 18th inning, in what was the longest postseason game in history. Ausmus caught 15 innings, and played 3 innings at first base.

In 2007, Ausmus batted .235, but was tied for second among all National League catchers with six stolen bases. He recorded his 100th career stolen base on July 27, becoming the 21st catcher all time to record that many steals.

Ausmus, lauded for his baseball smarts and highly regarded by teammates, was widely considered managerial material once his playing career ended.

Ausmus won the 2007 Darryl Kile Award "for integrity and courage", presented annually by local chapters of the Baseball Writers' Association of America (BBWAA) to players on the Astros and St. Louis Cardinals. In October 2007, Ausmus accepted a one-year, $2 million (plus incentives based on playing time) contract. The Astros planned for Ausmus to play on a part-time basis and mentor J. R. Towles, who would catch the majority of the games. Were Towles to struggle, however, the Astros were prepared to turn to Ausmus.

In May 2008, Ausmus (along with Johnny Damon, Andruw Jones, and Derek Lowe) was one of only four active major league players who had played at least 10 years in the majors without ever going on the disabled list.

On May 13, 2008, Ausmus got his 1,500th career hit. He was one of only eight catchers in major league history to get 1,500 hits and steal at least 100 bases.

In early June, with Towles batting only .145, the Astros optioned him to the minors and re-inserted Ausmus as a starter. Towles was replaced by journeyman minor-leaguer Humberto Quintero. Towles eventually came back, but during the season Ausmus, at 39, made more starts behind the plate (61) than either Towles or Quintero.

In July, Ausmus played at Nationals Park, appearing in his 44th major league stadium. Among active players, only Chris Gomez (47), Gary Sheffield (47), and Ken Griffey Jr. (45) had competed in more stadiums.

In August, he scored his 700th career run, becoming the 25th catcher to reach that mark.

Later in the month Ausmus said: "This will be my last year in Houston. It's just time to be closer to home." He has a home in San Diego, which narrowed it down to the Padres (which had expressed interest in him), Dodgers, and Angels. The Red Sox were also tempting, since Ausmus had a home near Boston, in Cape Cod.

On Sunday, August 24, the Astros played the New York Mets during the Mets International Heritage Week, an annual promotion. It happened to be Jewish Heritage Day, but though Ausmus is Jewish, he did not get to start the game. He had his only at bat during extra-innings, with the score tied at 4–4. Ausmus led off the 10th inning with his second homer of the season, and the Astros rallied for a 6–4 win.

Before his final game as an Astro on September 28, the team paid tribute to Ausmus with a humorous video. Ausmus went on to hit a two-run home run in the game.

Ausmus was Houston's all-time leader for catchers as of 2010 with 1,259 games, 1,119 starts, 970 hits, and 415 runs.

Los Angeles Dodgers (2009–10)
On January 26, 2009, Ausmus agreed to a 1-year, $1 million deal (plus incentives) to be a back-up catcher for the Los Angeles Dodgers.

"There's no question he can be a manager", Joe Torre said. "He's a smart cookie, everybody knows that, and he has an engaging personality." At the end of the season Torre had Ausmus manage the Dodgers for a game.

In 2009, Ausmus batted .295, including .333 with runners in scoring position, and .385 with 2 out and runners in scoring position, while limited to a career-low 107 at bats. He had never been on the disabled list in his 17-year career, giving him the most consecutive seasons of not going on the DL among all active players.

Ausmus became a free agent after the 2009 season, and on January 26, 2010, he agreed to a one-year, $850,000 deal (with total compensation guaranteed at $1 million) to return to the Dodgers for his 18th major league season. The deal also included a mutual option for 2011 worth $1 million; if either Ausmus or the Dodgers declined the option, Ausmus would be paid $150,000.

In 2010, Ausmus was the 5th-oldest player in the NL. On April 10, 2010, he was placed on the disabled list for the first time in his 18-year career in the Majors. He missed most of the season after having surgery in April to repair a lower back herniated disc, playing in only 21 games that season, and hitting .222.

Ausmus announced his retirement on October 3, 2010.

Defense

Ausmus was known as "a brilliant defensive catcher," "an incredibly smart catcher," and "one of the most respected game-callers and pitching-staff handlers" in the game, In 2010, he was chosen as the ninth-smartest athlete in sports by Sporting News.

Ausmus exhibited superior range at catcher compared to the league average each season in his career. He was known for his strong arm, quick release, nimble footwork, deft framing of pitches, and smart handling of pitchers, as well as being able to block pitches very well. While the vast majority of his games were as a catcher, Ausmus also played a handful of games at first base, second base, third base, and shortstop, all of them without making an error.

He led NL catchers in putouts in 1994, with 683. Ausmus nabbed a league-leading 39 opposing baserunners (41.9%) in 1995, second in the NL to Florida Marlins' Charles Johnson, and led the league's catchers with 14 double plays and 63 assists. On August 2, 1997, he was the first catcher to wear the FOX mini-camera, in a Houston-New York Mets game. In 1997, he had 16 double plays, a career best, and led the league in caught-stealing percentage (49.5%), as he threw out 46 of 93 runners. In 1998, he finished second to Charles Johnson in the NL Gold Glove voting.

In 1999, he led the American League with a .998 fielding percentage. In 2000, Ausmus appeared in 150 games (leading the AL), starting 140 (the most ever by a Detroit catcher). He led the league with 68 assists and 898 putouts, and threw out 30 of 74 baserunners attempting to steal (47.5%), second in the AL in that category. In 2001, he led the NL with a .997 fielding percentage and only one passed ball, had the second-best caught-stealing percentage (47.7%) in the majors, and won the first of two consecutive National League Gold Gloves with the Astros. He led the league again with a .997 fielding percentage and an 8.40 range factor, while being charged with only two passed balls in 2002. In 2003, Ausmus had a .997 fielding percentage, for the third season in a row. He led the league with a .999 fielding percentage, 884 putouts, and 134 games caught in 2005.

Ausmus led the league again in a league-leading 138 games caught with a .998 fielding percentage (the fifth-best of any catcher ever at the time) and a 7.94 range factor, with a league-leading 929 putouts and only one passed ball, and won his third Gold Glove in 2006. That year he caught the second-most games ever by a catcher at the age of 37—only Bob Boone, with 147 games, caught more at that age.

He made his franchise-record eighth Opening Day start at catcher for the Astros in 2007, breaking a tie with Alan Ashby. On July 22 of that year, Ausmus passed Gary Carter to move into sole possession of second place in major league career putouts by a catcher. In addition, he passed Ted Simmons that day to take sole possession of 12th place all-time on the games caught list, with 1,772. In 2007, he had the second-best fielding percentage (.995) and range factor (8.04) of all catchers in the NL, while being charged with only two passed balls.

In 2008, the Astros named Ausmus as an "emergency infielder." In April, he played second base in the ninth inning of a game, and later in the season he played first base and third base. In 2005, he even played an inning at shortstop. Through 2008, Ausmus ranked ninth all-time in games caught (1,887) and starts at catcher (1,720).

Ausmus's 1,141 games at catcher in that decade ranked second in the majors. As of July 12, 2009, he was third all-time among catchers in fielding percentage.

Among active catchers with at least 600 games played, he finished the 2009 season ranked tied for fourth with a .994 career fielding percentage behind Mike Redmond (.996), Joe Mauer (.996), and A. J. Pierzynski (.995).

Ausmus finished his career in 2010 ranked third in major league history with 12,839 putouts as a catcher, trailing only Iván Rodríguez and Jason Kendall, seventh in games caught with 1,938, and 10th in both range factor/game (7.12) and fielding percentage (.994). For his career, he threw out 30.2% of potential basestealers.

Managerial and special assistant career

San Diego Padres (2011–13)

In 2011, Ausmus was named field executive of the San Diego Padres. Ausmus held that position until the  season, when he departed to become the manager of the Detroit Tigers.

Detroit Tigers (2014–17)

On November 3, 2013, Ausmus was named the 38th manager in the history of the Detroit Tigers, succeeding Jim Leyland. At 45 years of age, he was the second-youngest manager in the American League. In his first year as manager, Ausmus led the Tigers to a 90–72 record, winning the American League Central division title. The Tigers were ousted in that season's ALDS by the Baltimore Orioles in three games.

In his second year as manager, the Tigers had a disappointing 74–87 record, finishing in last place in their division. In his third season, the Tigers finished in second place in the AL Central division with an 86–75 record, 2.5 games out of the second postseason Wild Card spot. Shortly after the 2016 season concluded, the Tigers announced they would exercise the fourth-year option on Ausmus's contract, keeping him as manager for the 2017 season.

During the 2017 season the Tigers lost 98 games and finished last. Ausmus had his pitchers issue 42 intentional walks, the most in the AL. On September 22, 2017, the Tigers opted to not extend Ausmus' four-year contract, announcing he would not return in 2018. He finished his stint with the Tigers with a record of 314 wins and 332 losses in the regular season. He lost all three of his playoff games. Through 2018, he was one of seven Jewish managers in MLB history. The others were Gabe Kapler, Bob Melvin, Jeff Newman, Norm Sherry, Lou Boudreau, and Lipman Pike.

Los Angeles Angels (2018–19)
Ausmus was a special assistant to Los Angeles Angels general manager Billy Eppler for the 2018 season.

On October 21, 2018, Ausmus was named the 17th manager in the history of the Los Angeles Angels, replacing Mike Scioscia. He signed a three-year contract, but was dismissed after the conclusion of the 2019 season. He finished with a record of 72 wins and 90 losses.

Oakland Athletics (2022)
On January 14, 2022, Ausmus was named the bench coach for the Oakland Athletics.

Managerial record

Team Israel; World Baseball Classic

Ausmus managed the Israel national baseball team in the Qualification Round to the 2013 World Baseball Classic from May 2012 through their series in September 2012. Team Israel, under the Classic's rules, was entitled to have non-Israeli citizens of Jewish heritage play for the team. Israel lost to Spain in extra innings in the Pool Finals, missing out on a spot in the World Baseball Classic.

Ausmus will be a coach for Team Israel, under manager Ian Kinsler, when it competes in the 2023 World Baseball Classic in Miami, Florida, starting March 11–15.

Bibliography

See also

 Houston Astros award winners and league leaders
 List of Dartmouth College alumni
 List of Houston Astros no-hitters
 List of Major League Baseball career assists as a catcher leaders
 List of Major League Baseball career games played as a catcher leaders
 List of Major League Baseball career putouts as a catcher leaders
 List of people from New Haven, Connecticut
 List of select Jewish baseball players

References

Further reading
 This chapter in Ruttman's oral history, based on a February 29, 2008 interview with Ausmus conducted for the book, discusses Ausmus's American, Jewish, baseball, and life experiences from youth to the present.

External links

 Official Detroit Tigers biography
 Encyclopedia of Baseball Catchers — Top 100 Fielding Seasons
 Brad Ausmus - Baseballbiography.com
 Baseball Almanac stats
 The Baseball Page
 Jews in Sports bio
 "Brad Ausmus," The National Jewish Sports Hall of Fame
 Martin Abramowitz, "The Boys of Summer and Seder: Baseball, Passover share openers," J Weekly, March 12, 2007
 Jewish major league career leaders

1969 births
Living people
Albany-Colonie Yankees players
Albuquerque Isotopes players
American League All-Stars
Baseball players from New Haven, Connecticut
Columbus Clippers players
Colorado Springs Sky Sox players
Dartmouth Big Green baseball players
Dartmouth College alumni missing graduation year
Detroit Tigers managers
Detroit Tigers players
Gold Glove Award winners
Gulf Coast Yankees players
Houston Astros players
Inland Empire 66ers of San Bernardino players
Jewish American baseball managers
Jewish American baseball players
Jewish Major League Baseball players
Los Angeles Angels executives
Los Angeles Angels managers
Los Angeles Dodgers players
Major League Baseball catchers
Oneonta Yankees players
People from Cheshire, Connecticut
Prince William Cannons players
San Diego Padres players
Cheshire High School alumni
21st-century American Jews